DeKalb School of the Arts (DSA) is a public performing arts magnet school in DeKalb County, Georgia, United States, east of the city of Atlanta. It is a part of the DeKalb County School District, as well as a member of the Arts Schools Network.

DeKalb School of the Arts is located at 1192 Clarendon Avenue, Avondale Estates, Georgia 30002.

History
DeKalb School of the Arts began in 1985 under the direction of Richard Leitgeb and became the DeKalb Center for the Performing Arts, a magnet program housed at Avondale High School.  In 1999 it was established as a separate entity and became the DeKalb School of the Arts, and in 2002 it moved into the former Briarcliff High School.  After eight years at its independent location, DeKalb School of the Arts moved back into the Avondale High School building in August 2010.  Since the closure of Avondale High School in 2011, DSA has occupied half of its old campus, sharing it with the DeKalb County School District's Registration, School Choice and Records departments.  In the winter of 2020 the school district abruptly decided to drop the eighth grade class from DSA.  Starting in August 2021 the school only has grades 9–12.

Art curriculum
Every student at the school has a major and a minor.  They must take three courses in their major and two courses in their minor.  The arts majors are: creative writing, dance, drama, film & digital media, instrumental music (band and orchestra), tech theater, visual arts, and vocal music.  In addition, students must earn twenty production credits every year through school performances or helping produce school performances.

Academic achievements

2021: The College Board named DSA an AP Access and Support School, an AP Challenge School, an AP School of Distinction, and an AP Expansion School - qualifying in every category it was eligible for
2018-2021:  Niche School Rankings consistently named DSA the Best High School for the Arts in Georgia
2017: US News/World Report named DSA the #2 high school in the state, the #24 Magnet School in the country, and the #89 best high school nationally
2017: DSA received a Platinum Award for being a Highest Performing High School under Georgia's Single Statewide Accountability System from the Governor's Office of Student Achievement
2010-2017: Ranked in the top 700 US high school by the Washington Post High School Challenge
2005-2013: Ranked in the top 10 high schools in metro Atlanta by Atlanta Magazine in 2005, 2007, 2009, 2012, 2013 
2010: The Georgia Public Policy Foundation ranked DSA as #2 of the best high schools in Georgia
2009: DSA is named a National Blue Ribbon School
2009: The Woodruff Arts Center named DSA as a Leader in Education
2007: Received a GRAMMY Foundation GRAMMY Signature School award

Notable alumni
DeKalb Center for the Performing Arts 1985-1999
 1991: Stacey Abrams – politician, lawyer, voting rights activist and author
1994: Omar Dorsey – movie actor

DeKalb School of the Arts 2000–present
 2002: Donald Glover – writer, director, comedian, actor, rapper, record producer under the name Childish Gambino
 2004: Lloyd – R&B singer
2007: Shonica Gooden – Broadway actress
2007: Myles Grier – TV actor, producer, writer
2014: Yung Baby Tate – rapper, singer, and record producer

Film location
The interior of Madison High in Madison, Delaware from Goosebumps.
Season 1 of CW's Black Lightning
Eric Nuetzel Middle School and hospital scenes in Apple TV's upcoming series Houston
An NBC pilot episode coming out in 2023

References

External links
 DeKalb School of the Arts
 DSA on Instagram
 DSA on Facebook
 DSA on YouTube
 DSA on Twitter

Magnet schools in Georgia (U.S. state)
Educational institutions established in 1999
DeKalb County School District high schools
1999 establishments in Georgia (U.S. state)